Dashtak (also known as Dashtak Kawar) is a village in Kavar Rural District, in the Central District of Kavar County, Fars Province, Iran. At the 2006 census, its population was 1,271, in 256 families.

References 

Populated places in Kavar County